Matapa druna, the grey-brand redeye, is a butterfly in the family Hesperiidae. It is found from Sikkim to northern Vietnam, China, Borneo and Bali.

The length of the forewings is 19.4-23.4 mm for males and 21.4–26 mm for females. The upperside is uniform brown and the underside is ferruginous.

The larvae feed on Bambusa species.

References

Butterflies described in 1866
Erionotini
Butterflies of Indochina
Taxa named by Frederic Moore